Superbeat: Xonic (stylized as SUPERBEAT: XONiC) is a 2015 rhythm game for the PlayStation Vita, then PlayStation 4, Xbox One and Nintendo Switch under the name of Superbeat: Xonic EX in 2017 developed by Nurijoy, a company formed by former employees of Pentavision. The game is published by Sony Computer Entertainment Korea in South Korea, in Japan, PM Studios in conjunction with Acttil in North America, and by Rising Star Games in Europe with a release date of Q4 2015 worldwide. It is considered a spiritual successor to the DJMax music game series and its gameplay is based on the 2014 arcade game Beatcraft Cyclon, also made by Nurijoy.

Gameplay 
The gameplay of Superbeat: Xonic consists of tapping notes to the beat of a song, either with the PlayStation Vita's face buttons or touchscreen. Modes, in order of difficulty, include 4 TRAX mode, 6 TRAX, and 6 TRAX FX. When selecting any mode, 3 tracks are played in succession and the player's performance is evaluated at the end. Local scores can be uploaded to a global online leaderboard if connected to the internet.

Superbeat features over 50 different tracks from a variety of genres, including soulful house, RnB, indie pop, progressive metal, and big beat and many more, and will include a collection of original music from producers such as 3rd Coast, ND Lee, Tsukasa and others.

World Tour

The World Tour mode consists of a series of missions that are unlocked as the player advances in level. Each mission requires the player to play one or more songs while accomplishing certain goals. The missions are set in fourteen nightclubs located across the world.

Development 

Superbeat: Xonic was announced in March 2015, with a western release later confirmed in June 2015. The game's North American publisher, PM Studios, was previously involved with the release of DJMax Fever. According to CEO Michael Yum, the decision to release the game on the Vita platform was based on fan feedback. The game is compatible with the PlayStation TV.

Reception 
Superbeat: Xonic received generally favorable reviews from critics.

References

External links

2015 video games
Music video games
Nintendo Switch games
PlayStation 4 games
PlayStation Vita games
Xbox One games
Video games developed in South Korea
Rising Star Games games
Single-player video games
Arc System Works games
Atlus games